Vladimir Ivanovich Lavrinenko (13 January 1932 – 7 January 2004) was a Soviet swimmer who won a bronze medal in the 1500 m freestyle at the 1954 European Aquatics Championships. He competed in the same event at the 1952 Summer Olympics, but did not reach the final. He won five national titles in 1954, 1955, 1958, 1959 and 1961 and set five national records in the 800 m and 1500 m freestyle events. 

He was born in Sukhumi, Abkhazia, but since 1955 lived in Moscow.

References

1932 births
2004 deaths
Sportspeople from Sukhumi
Swimmers at the 1952 Summer Olympics
Olympic swimmers of the Soviet Union
European Aquatics Championships medalists in swimming
Dynamo sports society athletes
Soviet male freestyle swimmers
Russian male freestyle swimmers
Male swimmers from Georgia (country)